The Gray Eagle Award is presented to the Naval Aviator on continuous active duty in U.S. Navy or Marine Corps who has held that designation for the longest period of time.
A similar trophy, the Gray Owl Award, is also presented to the Naval Flight Officer on continuous active duty in the U.S Navy or Marine Corps who has held that designation for the longest period of time.

Because they are also considered Naval Aviators, a third award, the Ancient Albatross Award, is the equivalent to the Gray Eagle Award in the United States Coast Guard and is presented under circumstances similar to that of the Gray Eagle.

History
The Gray Eagle Trophy made its first appearance in 1961 during the Navy's celebration of the Fiftieth Anniversary of Naval Aviation.

The original idea
In 1959, while serving as Commander in Chief, Allied Forces, Southern Europe, Admiral Charles R. Brown, USN, wrote to the Deputy Chief of Naval Operations (Air), Vice Admiral Robert B. Pirie, USN, telling of certain discussions he had with Vice Admiral George W. Anderson, then serving as Commander, Sixth Fleet.

"We suggest that it be determined from official records who, at all times, is the senior aviator in point of service in flying; that a baton or similar token be awarded him, and that, with due ceremony, this symbol be handed on down to the next man with the passing years."

Admiral Pirie took the matter from there. For a time the title "Bull Naval Aviator" was a leading contender for the choice of names for the senior aviator's title. Various cups, statuettes, plaques and medals were proposed. Finally, a competition was conducted between
aircraft companies desiring to sponsor the award. The design from the Chance Vought Aircraft Company (later LTV Corporation, Ling-Temco-Vought) was selected, and the Gray Eagle Award was brought into reality.

The first ceremony
On 5 January 1961, at Naval Aviation's Fiftieth Anniversary Ball, held at the Sheraton Park Hotel, Washington, D.C., Admiral Charles R. Brown received the Gray Eagle Trophy from Admiral James S. Russell, then serving as Vice Chief of Naval Operations.

While Admiral Brown was the first "active" aviator to receive the Trophy, replicas of the award were presented to all previous holders of the distinction, or their representative, during the ceremony. The recipients included Mrs. T. G. Ellyson, widow of Naval Aviator Number One, Commander Theodore G. Ellyson. Commander Ellyson would have held the Gray Eagle title from 1911 to 1928, if the award had been in existence.

The Trophy
The Trophy, donated by Chance Vought Aircraft (now Ling-Temco-Vought) depicts a silver eagle landing into the arresting gear of the Navy's first aircraft carrier, USS Langley (CV-1). The inscription reads:

"The Venerable Order of the Gray Eagle. The Most Ancient Naval Aviator on Active Duty. In recognition of a clear eye, a stout heart, a steady hand, and a daring defiance of gravity and the law of averages".

Names of those who have held the title, either actively or prior to the 1961 ceremony, are inscribed on the trophy's plaque.

The Gray Eagle Trophy may be kept in possession of and displayed by the command to which the Gray Eagle is assigned. Otherwise, it may be placed in the custody of the National Museum of Naval Aviation on a temporary basis until required for presentation to the successor. The ceremony date for the presentation of the Gray Eagle Award and the retirement date are not always the same.

The award is passed down from the previous holder of the award on his or her retirement, or in case of death. A miniature replica is presented to each incumbent as a personal memento.

Eligibility
Eligibility for the Gray Eagle Award is determined by the official active-duty precedence list for Naval Aviators, on continuous service, not recalled, who has held that designation for the longest period of time. The date of designation as a Naval Aviator is the governing factor for determining who will receive the award from the list of active duty officers. In the event that two or more aviators on active duty have been designated on the same date, the senior one qualified as the Gray Eagle.

Recipients

  * Charles R. Brown was the first to receive the award while on active duty; earlier awards were retroactive.
  ** Naval Aviator designation numbers were not issued after the beginning of World War II.

References
This article includes public domain information collected from the Naval Historical Center.

Grossnick, Roy, et al. Appendix 32.  "Gray Eagle Award."  History of Naval Aviation 1910-1995.  Washington, D.C.: Naval Historical Center, 1997.
Gray Eagles, Naval Historical Center 

Ancient Albatross Award
Admiral Bill Gortney Receives Gray Eagle Award
US Pacific Fleet Commander Soars as New Gray Eagle

United States naval aviation